Heteronychus is a genus of beetles belonging to the family Scarabaeidae, subfamily Dynastinae.

The species of this genus are found in Africa, Southeastern Asia and Australia.

Species:

Heteronychus abyssinicus 
Heteronychus amplipennis 
Heteronychus amplus 
Heteronychus andersoni 
Heteronychus annulatus 
Heteronychus approximans 
Heteronychus arator 
Heteronychus ascanius 
Heteronychus atratus 
Heteronychus basilewskyi 
Heteronychus bituberculatus 
Heteronychus brittoni 
Heteronychus carvalhoi 
Heteronychus citernii 
Heteronychus congoensis 
Heteronychus consimilis 
Heteronychus cordatus 
Heteronychus costatus 
Heteronychus cricetus 
Heteronychus curtulus 
Heteronychus desaegeri 
Heteronychus digitiformis 
Heteronychus fossor 
Heteronychus howdeni 
Heteronychus impudens 
Heteronychus infans 
Heteronychus inoportunus 
Heteronychus insignificus 
Heteronychus intermedius 
Heteronychus jacki 
Heteronychus krombeini 
Heteronychus licas 
Heteronychus lioderes 
Heteronychus lusingae 
Heteronychus minimus 
Heteronychus minutus 
Heteronychus mollis 
Heteronychus monodi 
Heteronychus mosambicus 
Heteronychus muticus 
Heteronychus paolii 
Heteronychus parumpunctatus 
Heteronychus parvus 
Heteronychus pauperatus 
Heteronychus plebejus 
Heteronychus puerilis 
Heteronychus puncticollis 
Heteronychus punctolineatus 
Heteronychus pygidialis 
Heteronychus rusticus 
Heteronychus sabackyi 
Heteronychus sacchari 
Heteronychus similis 
Heteronychus simulans 
Heteronychus sublaevis 
Heteronychus tenuestriatus 
Heteronychus tesari 
Heteronychus tristis 
Heteronychus vixstriatus 
Heteronychus wittei

References

Dynastinae
Scarabaeidae genera